The Hungry Wolf is a 1942 one-reel animated cartoon short subject from the Metro-Goldwyn-Mayer cartoon studio.
It tells the story of an old hungry wolf who one day, while starving during a cold winter, meets with a rabbit and is struggling between his instincts and conscience.

Plot
Once in a cold winter, an old wolf was hungry in earnest. When a wolf's stomach rumbles, it moves as if someone lives in it. But he has no food, when his stomach is so empty, and he begins and hallucinating, seeing a rope as sausages and a rolling pin as an ear of corn. A young rabbit, lost in the snow, comes in, and wolf eyes him hungrily. The rabbit is amazingly polite, and just before the wolf is about to cook him and eat, asks the wolf to be his father.

The  hungry wolf can not bring himself to eat him and instead angrily sends him away. But he remains hungry and begins to get angry, because hunger will not stop, so he's angry sets out in search of the rabbit. The rabbit's mother in a fit of worry sets out to find her son and indeed does so. But she finds him with the wolf lying next to him, having collapsed from the presumed cold. They carry him back home with them and give a him a blanket a tub of hot water to warm up his feet and some turkey to satisfy his hunger, much to his joy.

This is the final MGM cartoon produced by Hugh Harman, and he left the studio in April 1942.

References

External links

1942 films
1942 animated films
1942 short films
Metro-Goldwyn-Mayer animated short films
Films directed by Hugh Harman
Films about wolves
1940s American animated films
1940s animated short films
Metro-Goldwyn-Mayer films
Films scored by Scott Bradley
Films produced by Fred Quimby
Metro-Goldwyn-Mayer cartoon studio short films